"Fight the Power" (sometimes titled as "Fight the Power (Part 1 and Part 2)") is a song recorded by the Isley Brothers, who released the song as the first single off their landmark album, The Heat Is On. The song is notable for the usage of the word bullshit, which was censored during radio airplay.

History

Recording
The song was sparked in a 1975 recording session in which guitarist Ernie Isley, inspired by the news, wrote two songs: "Fight the Power" and an anti-poverty ballad titled "Harvest for the World". The group ended up recording both songs on the same day and eventually picked "Fight the Power" as the song to release first. "Harvest" would be featured on the album of the same name and would be released as the first single off that album.

The song was written almost fully by Ernie Isley with additional instrumental background composition by the band's keyboardist Chris Jasper. After playing the track on his guitar to his older brothers, Ronnie, Rudy, and O'Kelly, the vocal trio cut a unison lead vocal track in one take. Ernie was taken aback that Ron had uttered "bullshit". When asked why he said the word, Ron simply replied, "because it needed to be said" and "it's what people want to hear."

The song reflected a negative opinion of authority figures, a feeling shared by all the band members, which can explain the intensified vocalizing by Ron, Rudy, and Kelly. Later, the trio added in the background chant, "fight it!" to merge in with the brothers' vocal ad-libbing near the end. Though the track had a unison lead style, onstage during performances, Ron Isley would sing the majority of the song with his older brothers chipping in during some parts. As was with the majority of their recordings during the so-called 3+3 era, Ernie Isley and Chris Jasper had to share composition and lyrical credit with the other Isley members.

Release
The song was released in May 1975 and became one of the group's most popular recordings, reaching number 1 on the R&B singles chart and crossed over to the pop charts reaching number 4 on the Billboard Hot 100.  Due to its strong dance flavor, the song was played heavily at dance clubs helping the song to land at number 13 on Billboard's dance chart. "Fight the Power" gave the brothers their first song to peak in the top 20 on three different charts.

The success of the song also helped its album, The Heat Is On, reach number 1 on the pop chart. The song's lyric, "we gotta fight the powers that be", would be interpolated years later by rap group Public Enemy on their 1989 song of the same name. The intense style of the record would be repeated by the Isleys during other recordings including "Livin' in the Life", "Climbin' Up The Ladder" and "The Pride", which like "Fight the Power" before it, included a unison lead vocal by Ron, Rudy, and Kelly.

Chart history

Weekly charts

Year-end charts

Uses in popular culture
The song was used in a 2015 TV commercial for Nespresso featuring George Clooney and Danny DeVito. 
It was also used in the 1998 film Out of Sight, which stars Clooney and is coproduced by DeVito.
The song was used in the opening credits of the 2013 movie The Heat starring Sandra Bullock and Melissa McCarthy.

Personnel
Unless otherwise indicated, Information based on Original album Liner notes
Ronald Isley: lead vocals, background vocals 
Rudolph Isley: background vocals 
O'Kelly Isley, Jr.: background vocals
Ernie Isley: congas, electric guitar, drums
Marvin Isley: bass guitar
Chris Jasper: tambourine, clavinet keyboard, electric piano, ARP synthesizer

References

1975 singles
The Isley Brothers songs
Protest songs
Songs written by Chris Jasper
Songs written by Ernie Isley
Songs written by Rudolph Isley
Songs written by O'Kelly Isley Jr.
Songs written by Ronald Isley
Songs written by Marvin Isley
1975 songs
T-Neck Records singles